Viola cleistogamoides, commonly known as the hidden violet, is a perennial shrub of the genus Viola native to southeastern Australia. It is classified as endangered under New South Wales legislation.

References

Flora of New South Wales
Malpighiales of Australia
cleistogamoides